Liza May Minnelli (born March 12, 1946) is an American actress, singer, dancer, and choreographer. Known for her commanding stage presence and powerful alto singing voice, Minnelli is one of the very few performers awarded an Emmy, Grammy (Grammy Legend Award), Oscar, and Tony (EGOT). Minnelli is a Knight of the French Legion of Honour.

Daughter of actress and singer Judy Garland and director Vincente Minnelli, Minnelli was born in Los Angeles, spent part of her childhood in Scarsdale, New York, and moved to New York City in 1961 where she began her career as a musical theatre actress, nightclub performer, and traditional pop music artist. She made her professional stage debut in the 1963 Off-Broadway revival of Best Foot Forward and received the Tony Award for Best Actress in a Musical for starring in Flora the Red Menace in 1965, which marked the start of her lifelong collaboration with John Kander and Fred Ebb. They wrote, produced or directed many of Minnelli's future stage acts and television series and helped create her stage persona of a stylized survivor, including her career-defining performances of anthems of survival ("New York, New York", "Cabaret", and "Maybe This Time"). Along with her roles on stage and screen, this persona and her style of performance contributed to Minnelli's status as an enduring gay icon.

An acclaimed performance in the drama film The Sterile Cuckoo (1969) marked a film breakthrough for Minnelli and brought her a nomination for the Academy Award for Best Actress. She later received the award for her performance as Sally Bowles in the musical film Cabaret (1972), which brought her to international prominence. Most of her following films, including Lucky Lady (1975), New York, New York (1977), Rent-a-Cop (1988), and Stepping Out (1991), were not as successful, aside from the major box office hit and critically lauded Arthur (1981) which starred Minnelli. She was nominated for a Golden Globe for Best Actress in a Motion Picture – Musical or Comedy for Lucky Lady, New York, New York and Arthur. She returned to Broadway on a number of occasions, including The Act (1977), for which she received her second Tony Award, as well as The Rink (1984) and Liza's at The Palace.... (2008). Minnelli has also worked on various television formats and has predominantly focused on music hall and nightclub performances since the late 1970s. Her concert performances at Carnegie Hall in 1979 and 1987 and at Radio City Music Hall in 1991 and 1992 are recognized among her most successful. From 1988 to 1990, she toured with Frank Sinatra and Sammy Davis Jr. in Frank, Liza & Sammy: The Ultimate Event.While Minnelli is known for her renditions of American standards, her early-1960s pop singles were produced to attract a young audience.Scott Schechter (2006): The Complete Capitol Collection Her albums from 1968 to 1977 contained contemporary singer-songwriter material. In 1989, she ventured into the contemporary pop scene by collaborating with the Pet Shop Boys on the album Results. After a hiatus due to serious health problems, Minnelli returned to the concert stage in 2002 with Liza's Back and recurred as a guest star on the sitcom Arrested Development between 2003 and 2013. Since the 2010s, she has avoided huge concert performances in favor of small retrospective performances.

Early life
Minnelli was born on March 12, 1946, at Cedars-Sinai Medical Center on Beverly Boulevard in Los Angeles. She is the daughter of Judy Garland and Vincente Minnelli. Her parents named her after Ira Gershwin's song "Liza (All the Clouds'll Roll Away)". Minnelli has a half-sister, Lorna, and half-brother, Joey, from Garland's marriage to Sid Luft. She has another half-sister, Christiane Nina Minnelli (nicknamed Tina Nina), from her father's second marriage. Minnelli's godparents were Kay Thompson and Ira Gershwin.

Minnelli's first performing experience on film was at age three appearing in the final scene of the musical In the Good Old Summertime (1949); the film stars Garland and Van Johnson. In 1961 she moved to New York City, attending High School of Performing Arts and later, Chadwick School.

Career
Theatre
During 1961, Minnelli was an apprentice at the Cape Cod Melody Tent in Hyannis, Massachusetts. She appeared in the chorus of Flower Drum Song and played the part of Muriel in Take Me Along. She began performing professionally at age 17 in 1963 in an Off-Broadway revival of the musical Best Foot Forward, for which she received the Theatre World Award.

The next year, her mother invited her to perform with her in concert at the London Palladium. Both concerts were recorded and released as an album. She attended Scarsdale High School for one year, starring in a production of The Diary of Anne Frank which then went to Israel on tour. She turned to Broadway at 19, and won her first Tony Award as a leading actress for Flora the Red Menace. It was the first time that she worked with the musical pair John Kander and Fred Ebb.

Music
Minnelli began as a nightclub singer as an adolescent, making her professional nightclub debut at the age of 19 at the Shoreham Hotel in Washington, D.C. That same year she began appearing in other clubs and on stage in Las Vegas, Los Angeles, Chicago, Miami, and New York City. Her success as a live performer led her to record several albums for Capitol Records: Liza! Liza! (1964), It Amazes Me (1965), and There Is a Time (1966). In her early years, she recorded traditional pop standards as well as show tunes from various musicals in which she starred. Because of this fact, William Ruhlmann named her "Barbra Streisand's little sister". The Capitol albums Liza! Liza!, It Amazes Me, and There Is a Time were reissued on the two-CD compilation The Capitol Years in 2001, in their entirety.

From 1968 to the 1970s, she also recorded her albums Liza Minnelli (1968), Come Saturday Morning and New Feelin' (both 1970) for A&M Records. She released The Singer (1973) and Tropical Nights (1977) on Columbia Records.

In 1989, Minnelli collaborated with the Pet Shop Boys on Results, an electronic dance-style album. The release hit the top 10 in the UK and charted in the U.S., spawning four singles: "Losing My Mind"; "Don't Drop Bombs"; "So Sorry, I Said"; and "Love Pains". Later that year, she performed "Losing My Mind" live at the Grammys Award ceremony before receiving a Grammy Legend Award (the first Grammy Legend Awards were issued in 1990 to Minnelli, Andrew Lloyd Webber, Smokey Robinson, and Willie Nelson). With this award, she became one of only 16 people—a list that includes composer Richard Rodgers, Whoopi Goldberg, Barbra Streisand, and John Gielgud and others—to win an Emmy, Grammy, Tony Award, and Academy Award.

In April 1992, Minnelli appeared at the tribute concert for her late friend Freddie Mercury, performing "We Are the Champions" with the surviving members of the rock band Queen at Wembley Stadium in London. In 1996, Minnelli released a studio album titled Gently. It was a recording of jazz standards and included contemporary songs such as the cover of Does He Love You which she performed as a duet with Donna Summer. This album brought her a Grammy nomination for Best Traditional Pop Vocal Performance.

In 2006, Minnelli appeared on My Chemical Romance's album The Black Parade, providing backing vocals and singing a solo part with Gerard Way on the track "Mama". Minnelli was nominated in 2009 for Best Traditional Pop Vocal Album for her studio recording Liza's at the Palace...!, based on her hit Broadway show. Minnelli released an album on the Decca Records label titled Confessions on September 21, 2010.

Film

Minnelli's first appearance on film is as the baby in the final shot of her mother's film In the Good Old Summertime (1949). Her first credited film role was as the love interest in Charlie Bubbles (1967), Albert Finney's only film as director and star, although four years earlier, she did voiceover work for the animated film Journey Back to Oz, a sequel to The Wizard of Oz. Minnelli was the voice of Dorothy (a character played in the earlier film by her mother Judy Garland) in what would have been her first credited film role had it been released in 1964 as planned—the Filmation production was delayed, eventually being released in the UK during 1972.

Minnelli appeared in The Sterile Cuckoo (1969), Alan J. Pakula's first feature film, as Pookie Adams, a needy, eccentric teenager. Her performance was nominated for the Academy Award for Best Actress in a Leading Role. She played another eccentric character in Tell Me That You Love Me, Junie Moon (1970), directed by Otto Preminger. A nude scene in that film, filmed in a Massachusetts cemetery, resulted in a misdemeanor complaint by family of those buried there, and a "Liza Minnelli Bill" was introduced the following year to penalise filming in Massachusetts cemeteries without permission.

Minnelli appeared in her best-known film role, Sally Bowles, in the film version of Cabaret (1972). She said that one of the things she did to prepare was to study photographs of actresses Louise Glaum and Louise Brooks and the dark-haired women of the era in which the film is set. Minnelli won the Academy Award for Best Actress in a Leading Role for her performance, along with a Golden Globe Award, BAFTA Award, and also Sant Jordi Award and David di Donatello Award for Best Foreign Actress.

Following the success of Cabaret, Bob Fosse and Minnelli teamed for Liza with a 'Z'. A Concert for Television, a television special. The program aired two times on TV and was not seen again until a DVD release in 2006.

Minnelli appeared in three expensive flops in three years, with Variety suggesting by 1978 that she was the number-one choice for box office poison. First was Lucky Lady (1975), then she worked with her father in A Matter of Time (1976), co-starring Ingrid Bergman and then New York, New York (1977), which gave Minnelli her best known signature song. She sometimes performed duets on stage with Frank Sinatra, who recorded a cover version (for his Trilogy: Past Present Future album).

Minnelli made fewer film appearances from then on, but her next film, Arthur (1981), where she starred as Dudley Moore's love interest, was a big hit. She returned to film for Rent-A-Cop and Arthur 2: On the Rocks (both 1988) and Stepping Out (1991), a musical comedy drama. She later appeared in The Oh in Ohio in 2006 which received only a limited release in theatres.

Television

During the 1950s, Minnelli appeared as a child guest on Art Linkletter's show and sang and danced with Gene Kelly on his first television special in 1959. She was a guest star in one episode of Ben Casey and was a frequent guest on chat shows of the day including numerous appearances on shows hosted by Jack Paar, Merv Griffin, Mike Douglas, Joe Franklin, Dinah Shore and Johnny Carson. During the 1960s, she made several guest appearances on Rowan & Martin's Laugh-In as well as other variety shows such as The Ed Sullivan Show, The Hollywood Palace, and The Judy Garland Show. In 1965, she starred in the television special, The Dangerous Christmas of Red Riding Hood. A soundtrack was released to coincide with the specials

In 1964, she appeared as Minnie in her first television dramatic role in the episode "Nightingale for Sale" on Craig Stevens's short-lived series Mr. Broadway.

In 1970, Liza headlined her first television special, entitled Liza, with guest stars Anthony Newley, and Randy Newman. In 1972, she starred in the Bob Fosse directed Liza with a Z.In 1980, she made 2 television specials, Goldie and Liza Together, with Goldie Hawn, and An Evening with Liza Minnelli. In 1984, she made a guest appearance as Princess Alecia in 'The Princess and the Pea' episode of Faerie Tale Theatre. In 1985, she starred in a made-for-TV movie, A Time to Live, and in 1988, she appeared in Sam Found Out: A Triple Play.In December 1992, American Public Television aired Liza Minnelli Live from Radio City Music Hall produced by Phil Ramone and Chris Giordano. The show received six Emmy nominations and won the Emmy Award for Outstanding Individual Achievement in Music and Lyrics, awarded to Fred Ebb and John Kander. This was followed by appearances in two more Made-For-TV movies: Parallel Lives, and The West Side Waltz, in 1994 and 1995, respectively. 

Much later in her career, Minnelli made guest appearances on shows such as Arrested Development, Law & Order: Criminal Intent, Drop Dead Diva, and Smash. In the UK, she appeared on the Ruby Wax, Graham Norton and Jonathan Ross shows, and in October 2006, participated in a comedy skit on Charlotte Church's show and was featured on Michael Parkinson's show.

In November 2009, American Public Television aired Liza's at the Palace, taped from September 30 to October 1, 2009, in Las Vegas at the MGM Grand's Hollywood Theatre. The executive producers of the taping, Craig Zadan and Neil Meron, were previously involved with the 2005 rerelease of 1972's Emmy- and Peabody Award-winning Liza with a Z.

Later career
Minnelli returned to Broadway in 1997, taking over the title role in the musical Victor/Victoria, replacing Julie Andrews. In his review, New York Times critic Ben Brantley wrote "her every stage appearance is perceived as a victory of show-business stamina over psychic frailty. She asks for love so nakedly and earnestly, it seems downright vicious not to respond."

After a serious case of viral encephalitis in 2000, doctors predicted that Minnelli would spend the rest of her life in a wheelchair and perhaps not be able to speak again. However, taking vocal and dance lessons daily (especially with Sam Harris, Luigi Faccuito, Ron Lewis, and Angela Bacari), she managed to recover. She appeared on a September 19, 2001, episode of The Rosie O'Donnell Show, notable because it was Rosie's first show back following the September 11 attacks. Despite having had vocal surgery shortly before, she sang her signature song, "New York, New York", and received an enthusiastic ovation. She also returned to the stage in 2001 when asked by long-time friend Michael Jackson to perform at Madison Square Garden in New York City where she sang "Never Never Land" and the televised "You Are Not Alone" at the Michael Jackson: 30th Anniversary Special concert produced by future husband David Gest. Minnelli told reporters: "I am stable as a table."

Gest was so impressed with Minnelli's stamina and ability to stun audiences that he produced her in Liza's Back in Spring 2002, performing to rave reviews in London and New York City. The tour featured a tribute to her mother: after years of declining fans' pleas for her to sing Garland's signature song "Over The Rainbow", she concluded Act 1 with the final refrain of her mother's anthem to an instant ovation.

In 2003, she was reported to be in the talks for a Reality TV show starring her and her then-husband, David Gest.

From 2003 through 2005, she appeared as a recurring character on the Emmy Award-winning TV sitcom Arrested Development as Lucille Austero (also known as "Lucille 2"), the lover of both the sexually and socially awkward Buster Bluth and Buster's brother Gob. Minnelli appeared in the role for the show's fourth season in 2013.

On December 14, 2004, Minnelli made her first appearance in the UK after a long absence, performing as a special guest at the annual Royal Variety Performance. The performance was presented by the BBC, and was attended by Charles, Prince of Wales. It was staged at the London Coliseum, celebrating both its centenary year and the theatre's re-opening after an extensive 4 year restoration.

In 2005, Minnelli made her first film appearance in more than 15 years, in The Oh in Ohio. 

In September 2006, Minnelli made a guest appearance on the long-running drama Law & Order: Criminal Intent in "Masquerade", a Halloween-themed episode, broadcast on October 31, 2006.

Minnelli also completed guest vocals on My Chemical Romance's 2006 concept album The Black Parade, portraying "Mother War", a dark conception of the main character's mother in the song "Mama".

In 2007, it was announced that Minnelli was working on an album in tribute to Kay Thompson. This turned into Minnelli's return to Broadway in a new solo concert at the Palace Theatre titled Liza's at The Palace...!, which ran from December 3, 2008, through January 4, 2009. In her second act, she performed a series of numbers created by Thompson.

Minnelli was a character in the Australian musical The Boy from Oz (a biography of her first husband) starring Hugh Jackman. In the show's Broadway production, she was portrayed by Stephanie J. Block. In October 2009, Minnelli toured Australia, and appeared on Australian Idol as a mentor and guest judge. Minnelli made a cameo appearance in the May 2010 release of Sex and the City 2, in which she covered Beyoncé's hit "Single Ladies (Put a Ring on It)" and Cole Porter's "Ev'ry Time We Say Goodbye". She made a starring appearance in December 2010 in The Apprentice.

Also in 2010, Minnelli released an album of a number of American standards "unplugged" with long-time collaborator Billy Stritch, showing a sultrier and softer, more interpretive side to her artistry. The songs are said to have been recorded several years prior and later released as the album Confessions.

On June 14, 2012, Minnelli headlined at Hampton Court Palace Festival. On May 9, 2014, Minnelli had a guest appearance on Cher's Dressed to Kill Tour in Brooklyn, performing "Girls Just Want to Have Fun" with Cyndi Lauper and Rosie O'Donnell.

Personal life
Minnelli has long suffered from alcoholism and has been addicted to prescription drugs, originating from a Valium prescription after her mother died. Her use of recreational drugs in the 1970s was noted by Andy Warhol, who in a 1978 diary entry recalled Minnelli arriving at Halston's house and imploring the host to "Give me every drug you've got." Along with Warhol and Bianca Jagger, Minnelli made frequent appearances at New York City nightclubs during the late 1970s, including Studio 54. Minnelli left her 1984 musical The Rink to enter the Betty Ford Clinic.

Minnelli has stated that she is an Episcopalian.

Minnelli's friendships have included the singer Adam Ant whom she advised on what to wear when he was presented to Queen Elizabeth II after the 1981 Royal Variety Performance at which his band Adam and the Ants performed.  Ant in turn namechecked Minnelli in the track "Crackpot History and the Right To Lie" on his 1982 solo album Friend or Foe.

During an Australian visit in 1964, Minnelli and her then-boyfriend Peter Allen were invited to the opening of the Compass Centre in Bankstown, Sydney. They were awarded the titles of King and Queen of the Compass Centre.

Marriages
Minnelli has married and divorced four times. Her first marriage was to entertainer Peter Allen on March 3, 1967. Australian-born Allen was Judy Garland's protégé in the mid-1960s. Allen and Minnelli divorced on July 24, 1974. Minnelli told The Advocate editor-in-chief Judy Wieder in September 1996 "I married Peter, and he didn't tell me he was gay. Everyone knew but me. And I found out ... well, let me put it this way: I'll never surprise anybody coming home as long as I live. I call first!"

Following the divorce from Allen, Minnelli married Jack Haley Jr., a producer and director, on September 15, 1974. His father, Jack Haley, was Garland's co-star in The Wizard of Oz. They divorced in April 1979.

Minnelli was married to Mark Gero, a sculptor and stage manager, from December 4, 1979, until their divorce in January 1992.

Minnelli was married to David Gest, a concert promoter, from March 16, 2002, until their separation in July 2003, and their divorce in April 2007."Gest: Liza's still a legend" Irish Examiner, April 20, 2007 In a 2003 lawsuit, Gest alleged that Minnelli beat him in alcohol-induced rages during their marriage.

Minnelli also had relationships with Rock Brynner (son of Yul Brynner), Desi Arnaz, Jr., Peter Sellers, and Martin Scorsese.Smilgis, Martha. Lucy's Baby Desi Arnaz Jr. Is Still Reaching, but Now It's for Stardom, Not Starlets" . People Magazine, June 19, 1978 Her close friendship with French pop singer Charles Aznavour was described by Aznavour as "more than friends and less than lovers".

Minnelli has no children; one pregnancy left her with a hiatal hernia as a result of the medical steps taken to try to save the baby.

Philanthropy

Throughout her lifetime, Minnelli has served on various charities and causes. She served on the board of directors of The Institutes for The Achievement of Human Potential (IAHP) for 20 years, a nonprofit educational organization that introduces parents to the field of child brain development. In a 2006 interview with Randy Rice at Broadwayworld.com, Minnelli said that she was the person who told Elizabeth Taylor about HIV/AIDS while talking about their mutual friend Rock Hudson. She has also dedicated much time to amfAR, The Foundation for AIDS Research, which was co-founded by Taylor.

In 2007, she stated in an interview with Palm Springs Life: "AmfAR is important to me because I've lost so many friends that I knew [to AIDS]". In 1994, she recorded the Kander & Ebb tune "The Day After That" and donated the proceeds to AIDS research. The same year, she performed the song in front of thousands in Central Park at the 25th anniversary of the Stonewall riots.

Discography

Studio albumsLiza! Liza! (1964)It Amazes Me (1965)There Is a Time (1966)Liza Minnelli (1968)Come Saturday Morning (1969)New Feelin' (1970)The Singer (1973)Tropical Nights (1977)Results (1989)Gently (1996)Confessions (2010)

Credits
Film

 Television 

Theatre

 Awards and nominations 

See also
 Honorific nicknames in popular music
 List of persons who have won Academy, Emmy, Grammy, and Tony Awards

References

Further reading
Leigh, Wendy (1993), Liza: Born a Star. E.P. Dutton
Mair, George (1996), Under the Rainbow: The Real Liza Minnelli. Carol Publishing
Schechter, Scott (2004), The Liza Minnelli Scrapbook. Kensington Books/Citadel Press 
Spada, James (1983), Judy and Liza''. Doubleday

External links

 
 
 
 
 
 Liza Minnelli interview with KVUE-TV in 1988 about Arthur 2: On the Rocks from Texas Archive of the Moving Image

 
1946 births
Living people
American child actresses
American women pop singers
American people of Italian descent
American people of English descent
American people of French-Canadian descent
American people of Irish descent
American people of Scottish descent
American film actresses
American musical theatre actresses
American television actresses
American vedettes
American voice actresses
Nightclub performers
Traditional pop music singers
Judy Garland
American LGBT rights activists

Best Actress Academy Award winners
Best Actress BAFTA Award winners
Best Miniseries or Television Movie Actress Golden Globe winners
Best Musical or Comedy Actress Golden Globe (film) winners
David di Donatello winners
David di Donatello Career Award winners
Grammy Award winners
Grammy Legend Award winners
Primetime Emmy Award winners
Tony Award winners
A&M Records artists
Cadence Records artists
Capitol Records artists
Columbia Records artists
Hybrid Recordings artists
Fiorello H. LaGuardia High School alumni

Actresses from Hollywood, Los Angeles
Actresses from New York City
Singers from New York (state)
Singers from Los Angeles
Special Tony Award recipients
20th-century American actresses
21st-century American actresses
20th-century American singers
21st-century American singers
20th-century American women singers
21st-century American women singers
Officiers of the Légion d'honneur
American contraltos